Woodward is a surname.

People with the name
Notable people with the name Woodward include:

Actors 
 Adam Woodward (born 1992), British actor
 Edward Woodward (1930–2009), British actor
 Joanne Woodward (born 1930), American actress
 Jonathan M. Woodward (born 1973), American actor
 Morgan Woodward (1925–2019), American actor
 Peter Woodward (born 1956), British actor
 Pollyanna Woodward (born 1982), British television presenter
 Sarah Woodward (born 1963), British actress
 Shannon Woodward (born 1984), American actress
 Tim Woodward (born 1953), British actor

Architects
 Benjamin Woodward (1816–1861), Irish architect
 Robert Woodward (architect) (1923–2010), Australian architect

Art, literature, music 
 Alice B. Woodward (1862–1951), British illustrator
 Alun Woodward (born 1971), Scottish singer-songwriter known as Lord Cut-Glass
 Anna Woodward (1868–1935), American painter
 Antony Woodward (born 1963), British writer
 Buddy Woodward (born 1963) American musician, composer, singer, actor, and anime voice performer; member of The Dixie Bee-Liners and The Kingston Trio
 Caroline Marshall Woodward (1828–1890), American author
 George Moutard Woodward (1760–1809), British amateur painter and caricaturist
 George Ratcliffe Woodward (1848–1934), English composer
 Gerard Woodward (born 1961), British novelist and poet
 J. K. Woodward, American comic book artist
 John Douglas Woodward (1846–1924), American landscape artist
 Keren Woodward (born 1961), British singer and songwriter; member of Bananarama
 Lydia Woodward, American television writer and producer
 Lucy Woodward (born 1977), English-American singer/songwriter
 Mabel May Woodward (1877–1945), American painter and art educator
 Richard Woodward (organist) (1743–1777), organist of Christ Church Cathedral, Dublin
 Richard B. Woodward, arts critic for The New York Times
 Roger Woodward (born 1944), Australian pianist
 Tom Jones (born 1940, birth name Thomas Jones Woodward), Welsh singer 
 William Woodward (artist) (1859–1939), American artist and educator

Business and finance 
 Allen Harvey Woodward (1876–1950), American businessman and baseball team owner
 Charles A. Woodward (1852–1937), Canadian merchant, founder of the Woodward's Department Stores chain
 Charles N. "Chunky" Woodward (1924–1990), Canadian merchant and rancher, son of William Culham Woodward and grandson of Charles A. Woodward, long-time owner of the Douglas Lake Ranch
 Ed Woodward (born 1971), British Accountant and vice chairman of Manchester United F.C.
 Emerson Francis Woodward (1879–1943), American oilman
 James T. Woodward (1837–1910), American banker and owner of a major thoroughbred horse dynasty
 William Woodward, Sr. (1876–1953), American banker and horse breeder
 William Woodward, Jr. (1920–1955), American banker and "The Shooting of the Century" victim
 William Culham Woodward (1885–1957), Canadian merchant and former Lieutenant-Governor of British Columbia, son of Charles A. Woodward and father of C.N. Woodward

Clergy, theologians, and religious figures
 Richard Woodward (bishop) (1726–1794), Bishop of Cloyne  in the Church of Ireland
 Thomas Best Woodward (1814–1875), Irish theologian
 Thomas Bullene Woodward, American Episcopal priest
 Thomas E. Woodward, Christian apologist

Government, law, and military  
 Alfred Woodward (1913–2007), American judge; father of Bob Woodward
 Asa Woodward, (1830–1921), American politician from Connecticut
 Augustus B. Woodward (1774–1827), first Chief Justice of the Michigan Territory
 Benjamin Woodward (New York politician) (1780–1841), New York politician
 Charles Edgar Woodward (1876–1942), US federal judge and former Attorney General of Illinois
 Edward Woodward (judge) (1928–2010), Australian judge and Royal Commissioner
 Eric Woodward (1899–1967), Governor of New South Wales, Australia
 George Washington Woodward (1809–1875), US Representative from Pennsylvania
 James G. Woodward (1840–1923), American newspaperman and politician, four-term mayor of Atlanta, Georgia
 John Woodward (lawyer) (born 1934), Australian lawyer and Environmental Commissioner
 Joseph A. Woodward (1806–1885), US Representative from South Carolina
 Neil Woodward (born 1962), US Navy officer and former astronaut
 Oliver Woodward (1885–1966), Australian metallurgist and World War I soldier
 Orpheus S. Woodward (1837–1919), American Union Civil War brevet brigadier general
 Philip Woodward (judge) (1912–1997), Australian judge and Royal Commissioner
 Sandy Woodward (1932–2013), British admiral
 Shaun Woodward (born 1958), British politician
 Stanley Woodward (1899–1992), American diplomat
 William Woodward (South Carolina politician), US Representative from South Carolina (1815–1817); father of Joseph A. Woodward
 William G. Woodward (1808–1871), Associate Justice of the Iowa Supreme Court
 Barbara Woodward (born 1961), British diplomat and China expert

Science and academia

Biology, geography, and geology
 Arthur Smith Woodward (1864–1944), British paleontologist involved with the Piltdown Man
 Bernard Barham Woodward (1853–1930), British malacologist  
 Bernard Henry Woodward (1846–1916), British-born naturalist and director of the Western Australian Museum
 David Woodward (cartographer) (1942–2004), English-American cartographer
 Henry Woodward (geologist) (1832–1921), British geologist and invertebrate paleontologist
 Henry Page Woodward (1858–1917), British-born Australian geologist 
 Horace Bolingbroke Woodward (1848–1914), British geologist, awarded the Wollaston Medal 
 John Woodward (naturalist) (1665–1728), English naturalist and geologist
 Joseph Janvier Woodward (1833–1884),  American Civil War surgeon
 Samuel Woodward (1790–1838), British geologist and antiquarian
 Samuel Pickworth Woodward (1821–1865), British geologist and malacologist with the British Museum and Royal Agricultural College
 Theodore Woodward (1914–2005), American medical researcher
 Thomas Jenkinson Woodward (1745–1820), English botanist
 The Woodward brothers, John D. S. and Richard B. (c. 1848 – 1905), English missionaries and ornithologists

Medicine 
 Alice Woodward Horsley (1871–1957), New Zealand doctor, the first registered woman doctor in Auckland

Chemistry, engineering, mathematics, and physics
 Carol S. Woodward, American computational mathematician
 Foster Neville Woodward FRSE (1905–1985), British chemist working on chemical weapons
 Henry Woodward (inventor) (fl. 1874), Canadian inventor involved with the incandescent bulb
 James F. Woodward (born 1941), American physicist and historian of science
 Philip Woodward (1919–2018), British mathematician, radar engineer, and horologist
 Robert Burns Woodward (1917–1979), American organic chemist; Nobel Prize winner
 Robert Simpson Woodward (1849–1921), American physicist and mathematician

Other academics 
 Amanda Woodward, American psychologist and professor at University of Chicago
 C. Vann Woodward (1908–1999), American historian
 Calvin M. Woodward (1837–1914), American educator 
 Donald Woodward Lee, (1910–1977), American philologist
 F. L. Woodward (born 1871), English educator, Pali scholar and theosophist
 Joan Woodward (1916–1971), British sociologist
 Llewellyn Woodward (1890–1971), British historian
 Mark R. Woodward (born 1952), American academic

Sports 
 Alan Woodward (born 1946), British soccer player
 Alex Woodward (born 1993), Australian rules footballer
 Andy Woodward (born 1973), English footballer
 Bethy Woodward (born 1992), British Paralympic athlete
 Brian Woodward (born 1929), English professional footballer
 Cameron Woodward (born 1985), Australian motorcycle speedway rider
 Chris Woodward (born 1976), American Major League Baseball player
 Clive Woodward (born 1956), Rugby union World Cup winning coach
 Danielle Woodward (born 1965), Australian slalom canoer
 Frank Woodward (baseball) (1894–1961), American baseball pitcher
 Frank Woodward (rugby league) (1885–1941), New Zealand rugby player
 Fred Woodward (1899–1963), British footballer
 Gabe Woodward (born 1979), American swimmer
 Harry Woodward (footballer, born 1887) (1887 – after 1909), English footballer
 Jason Woodward (born 1990), New Zealand rugby player
 John Woodward (footballer, born 1947), English footballer
 John Woodward (footballer born 1949), Scottish former footballer
 Johnny Woodward (1924–2002), English footballer
 Nathan Woodward (born 1989), British track and field athlete
 Rob Woodward (born 1962), American baseball pitcher
 Steve Woodward (born 1947), New Zealand cricket umpire 
 Vivian Woodward (1879–1954), British amateur football (soccer) player
 Viv Woodward (born 1914), Welsh professional footballer
 William Woodward (cricketer) (died 1862), English cricketer
 Woody Woodward (born 1942), American Major League Baseball player

Other fields
 Bernard Bolingbroke Woodward (1816–1869), English minister, antiquarian, and royal librarian at Windsor Castle
 Bob Woodward (born 1943), American journalist, author, and Watergate reporter
 Caroline M. Clark Woodward (1840–1924), American activist, writer
 Daphne Woodward, French–English translator
 Ella Woodward (born 1991), British food writer
 Grace Woodward (born 1976), English fashion stylist and television presenter
 Indiana Woodward (born 1993 or 1994), French ballet dancer
 Louise Woodward (born 1978), British au pair implicated in a baby-shaking death in the 1990s
 Stanley Woodward (editor) (1895–1965), American newspaper editor and sportswriter

Fictional characters
 Amanda Woodward (Melrose Place), fictional television character played by Heather Locklear
Anthony "Tony" Woodward a.k.a. Girder, supervillain from the DC Comics universe and enemy of the Flash (Wally West)

See also
Woodard (disambiguation)
Woodward (disambiguation)
Woodyard (disambiguation)

English-language surnames
English toponymic surnames